Tobaiwa Mudede is the Registrar-General of Zimbabwe for Robert Mugabe's government. Mudede has been accused by international human rights organizations of falsifying voting records to ensure Mugabe remains in power. Mudede gained a reputation from foreign journalists as a key player in press censorship and a culpable member of the Mugabe regime for human rights violations.

Elections 
Tobaiwa Mudede has been in charge of all elections held in Zimbabwe since 1980. His critics charge him with manipulating the elections to favor President Mugabe and ZANU-PF, a charge he denies.

Family
Tobaiwa Mudede is related to writer and filmmaker Charles Mudede.

References

Living people
1944 births
ZANU–PF politicians